Miles Davis at Newport 1955–1975: The Bootleg Series Vol. 4 is a four-CD album compiling five of Miles Davis's performances at the Newport Jazz Festival in Newport, Rhode Island and two European concerts branded under the Festival moniker with one additional track recorded in New York City.

The first disc contains Davis's debut appearance at the 1955 festival and his headlining performance from 1958 which was originally released in part as one side of the LP Miles & Monk at Newport (Columbia, 1964) and given its first complete release as part of The Complete Columbia Recordings of Miles Davis with John Coltrane box set in 1999. The second disc contains previously unreleased performances from the 1966 and 1967 festivals. The third disc contains the Newport Festival concert from 1969 which was released as part of Bitches Brew Live in 2011, a complete previously unreleased concert from Berlin in 1973 and one performance from New York in 1975. The fourth CD contains a complete previously unreleased performance from Switzerland in 1971.

Reception

Miles Davis at Newport 1955–1975: The Bootleg Series Vol. 4 received positive reviews on release. At Metacritic, which assigns a normalised rating out of 100 to reviews from mainstream critics, the album has received a score of 92, based on 14 reviews which is categorised as universal acclaim. Matt Collar's review on AllMusic stated "Miles Davis at Newport details the association between Davis and the festival, each performance serendipitously documenting his ever-morphing sound, from swinging cool jazz in the '50s to aggressive, free jazz-influenced modal bop in the '60s and finally to funky, acid-soaked fusion in the '70s." PopMatterss John Paul gave the album 10 out of 10 saying "Perhaps no other recording better illustrates how Miles Davis bridged the gap between jazz's old guard and its younger visionaries". The Observers Dave Gelly said "Summer is traditionally the season for unearthing treasures from the jazz archives, and this is a real prize."

Track listing
All compositions written by Miles Davis, except where noted.

Disc One (64:47)
 Spoken Introductions by Duke Ellington and Gerry Mulligan – 1:27
 "Hackensack" (Thelonious Monk) – 8:02
 "'Round Midnight" (Monk) – 6:11
 "Now's the Time" (Charlie Parker) – 8:48
 Recorded July 17, 1955 at the Newport Jazz Festival, Festival Field, Newport, RI
 Introduction by Willis Connover – 2:16
 "Ah-Leu-Cha" (Parker) – 5:52
 "Straight, No Chaser" (Monk) – 8:47
 "Fran-Dance" – 7:13
 "Two Bass Hit" (Dizzy Gillespie, John Lewis) – 4:10
 "Bye Bye Blackbird" (Ray Henderson, Mort Dixon) – 9:10
 "The Theme" – 2:49 
 Recorded July 3, 1958 at the Newport Jazz Festival, Festival Field, Newport, RI

Disc Two (72:49)
 "Gingerbread Boy" (Jimmy Heath) – 8:29 
 "All Blues" – 10:27
 "Stella by Starlight" (Victor Young, Ned Washington) – 7:58
 "R.J." (Ron Carter) – 6:20
 "Seven Steps to Heaven" (Miles Davis, Victor Feldman) – 4:45
 "The Theme"/Closing Announcement by Leonard Feather – 2:18
 Recorded July 4, 1966 at the Newport Jazz Festival, Festival Field, Newport, RI
 Spoken Introduction by Del Shields – 0:38
 "Gingerbread Boy" (Heath) – 8:42
 "Footprints" (Wayne Shorter) – 7:53
 "'Round Midnight" (Monk) – 6:41
 "So What" – 8:18 
 "The Theme"/Closing Announcement by Del Shields – 0:19 
 Recorded July 2, 1967 at the Newport Jazz Festival, Festival Field, Newport, RI

Disc Three (78:21)
 "Miles Runs the Voodoo Down" – 10:27
 "Sanctuary" (Shorter) – 3:52
 "It's About That Time/The Theme" – 9:48
 Recorded July 5, 1969 at the Newport Jazz Festival, Festival Field, Newport, RI
 Band Warming Up/Voice Over Introduction – 0:36
 "Turnaroundphrase" – 10:57
 "Tune in 5" – 4:12
 "Ife" – 13:54
 "Untitled Original" – 11:31
 "Tune in 5 (Reprise)" – 6:07
 Recorded November 1, 1973 at the Newport Jazz Festival in Europe, Berlin Philharmonie, Berlin, Germany
 "Mtume" – 6:57
 Recorded July 1, 1975 at the Newport Jazz Festival – New York, Avery Fisher Hall, New York, NY
 
Disc Four (79:45)
 "Directions" – 13:05
 "What I Say" – 10:43
 "Sanctuary" – 3:42
 "It's About That Time" – 13:21
 "Bitches Brew" – 11:55
 "Funky Tonk" – 25:43
 "Sanctuary (Reprise)" (Shorter) – 1:15 
 Recorded October 22, 1971 at the Newport Jazz Festival in Europe, Neue Stadthalle, Dietikon, Switzerland

Personnel

1955
All-Star Jam Session:
 Miles Davis – trumpet
 Zoot Sims – tenor saxophone
 Gerry Mulligan – baritone saxophone
 Thelonious Monk – piano
 Percy Heath – bass
 Connie Kay – drums

1958
 Miles Davis – trumpet
 Cannonball Adderley – alto saxophone
 John Coltrane – tenor saxophone
 Bill Evans – piano
 Paul Chambers – bass
 Jimmy Cobb – drums

1966 & 1967
 Miles Davis – trumpet
 Wayne Shorter – tenor saxophone
 Herbie Hancock – piano
 Ron Carter – bass
 Tony Williams – drums

1969
 Miles Davis – trumpet
 Chick Corea – electric piano
 Dave Holland – bass
 Jack DeJohnette – drums

1971
 Miles Davis – electric trumpet with wah-wah
 Gary Bartz – soprano saxophone, alto saxophone
 Keith Jarrett – electric piano, organ
 Michael Henderson – electric bass
 Leon "Ndugu" Chancler – drums
 Don Alias – percussion
 James Mtume Foreman – percussion

1973
 Miles Davis – electric trumpet with wah-wah, organ
 Dave Liebman – soprano saxophone, tenor saxophone, flute
 Pete Cosey – electric guitar, percussion
 Reggie Lucas – electric guitar
 Michael Henderson – electric bass
 Al Foster – drums
 James Mtume Foreman – percussion

1975
 Miles Davis – electric trumpet with wah-wah, organ
 Sam Morrison – tenor saxophone
 Pete Cosey – electric guitar, percussion
 Reggie Lucas – electric guitar
 Michael Henderson – electric bass
 Al Foster – drums
 James Mtume Foreman – percussion

References

2015 live albums
Miles Davis live albums
Albums recorded at the Newport Jazz Festival